Garra ornata is a species of ray-finned fish in the family Cyprinidae from rivers in West and Central Africa.

References 

Garra
Fish described in 1917